Paula Kelly is the name of:

 Paula Kelley (born 1970), American indie pop singer-songwriter
 Paula Kelly (singer) (1919–1992), American big band singer
 Paula Kelly (actress) (1943–2020), American actress and dancer